The following is a list of parastatals and agencies in the Government of Rivers State.

Agencies and parastatals

Agencies and parastatals, typically reporting to a ministry, include:
Rivers State Bureau on Public Procurement
Road Maintenance and Rehabilitation Agency
Road Traffic Management Authority
Rivers State University
Rivers State Television Authority
Rivers State Sustainable Development Agency
Ken Saro-Wiwa Polytechnic
Rivers State Newspaper Corporation
Rivers State Microfinance Agency
Greater Port Harcourt City Development Authority
Housing and Property Development Authority
Rivers State College of Health Science and Technology
Rivers State College of Arts and Science
Rivers State University of Education
Rivers State Broadcasting Corporation
Rivers State Agricultural Development Programme
Universal Basic Education Board
Senior Secondary Schools Board
Christian Pilgrims Welfare Board
Local Government Service Commission
Rivers State Waste Management Authority
Muslims Pilgrims Welfare Board

Commissions
Rivers State Civil Service Commission
Rivers State Independent Electoral Commission
Rivers State Judicial Service Commission
Rivers State Local Government Service Commission
Rivers State Water Services Regulatory Commission

Other
Rivers State Fire Service
Rivers State Economic Advisory Council
Rivers State Internal Revenue Service
Rivers State Police
Rivers State Tourism Development Agency

See also
Government of Rivers State
List of government ministries of Rivers State

References

 
Organizations based in Rivers State
Rivers State-related lists
Civil service in Rivers State
Rivers State